The following table indicates the party of elected officials in the U.S. state of Missouri:

Governor
Lieutenant Governor
Secretary of State
Attorney General
State Treasurer
State Auditor

The table also indicates the historical party composition in the:

State Senate
State House of Representatives
State delegation to the U.S. Senate
State delegation to the U.S. House of Representatives

For years in which a presidential election was held, the table indicates which party's nominees received the state's electoral votes.

Notes

See also
Law and government in Missouri
Elections in Missouri

Politics of Missouri
Government of Missouri
Missouri